The Hochkarspitze is a 2,484 m high mountain in the Karwendel on the border between Bavaria and Tyrol. It is part of the Northern Karwendel Chain, which runs initially northwards before swinging east at the Wörner. The Hochkarspitze lies east of the Wörner summit and is the highest point of the massif that it forms jointly with the Wörner.

The Hochkarspitze may be climbed in a difficult mountain tour from the south, partly over trackless terrain (sure-footedness and a head for heights are required).

References

Mountains of the Alps
Mountains of Bavaria
Mountains of Tyrol (state)
Two-thousanders of Austria
Karwendel
Two-thousanders of Germany